Miss Universe Australia 2019, the 15th edition of the Miss Universe Australia pageant, was held on June 27, 2019, at Sofitel Melbourne on Collins, Melbourne, Victoria. crowned Priya Serrao of Victoria at the end of the event. Serrao represented Australia at Miss Universe 2019, but was unplaced.

Final results

Special Awards

Official Delegates
Meet the 28 national delegates competing for the title of Miss Universe Australia 2019:

References

External links
Official Website

2019
2010s in Melbourne
2019 beauty pageants